WWF Tough Enough is the first 2001 soundtrack compilation album by WWE Tough Enough. The album features Various Artists of the nu or alternative metal and hard rock music scene of the mid 1990s' to early 2000s'. The album was created as a soundtrack compilation for the show of the same name.

Track listing

Personnel
Michael Ostin - Executive Producer
Deftones - Performer
Saliva - Performer
Debbie Reinberg - Music Business Affairs
Godsmack - Performer
Buckcherry - Performer
Disturbed - Performer
Papa Roach - Performer
Mudvayne - Performer
Alien Ant Farm - Performer
Ron Handler - Executive Producer
Tom Baker - Mastering

See also

Music in professional wrestling

References

Professional wrestling albums
WWE SmackDown
2001 compilation albums
2001 soundtrack albums
WWE albums
Nu metal albums